Sándor Kiss (23 April 1941 – 10 November 2012) was a Hungarian gymnast. He competed in eight events at the 1968 Summer Olympics.

References

External links
 

1941 births
2012 deaths
Hungarian male artistic gymnasts
Olympic gymnasts of Hungary
Gymnasts at the 1968 Summer Olympics
People from Tura, Hungary
Sportspeople from Pest County